A number of plants in the genus Vaccinium share the common name Evergreen blueberry:

 Vaccinium darrowii (Darrow's evergreen blueberry, southeastern United States)
 Vaccinium myrsinites (Shiny blueberry, southeastern United States)
 Vaccinium ovatum (Evergreen huckleberry, Pacific coast of North America)